Synaphridae is a family of spiders with thirteen described species in three genera. It was first described as a subfamily of Anapidae, but it has since been raised to family status.

Genera

, the World Spider Catalog accepts the following genera:

Africepheia Miller, 2007 — Madagascar
Cepheia Simon, 1894 — Southern Europe
Synaphris Simon, 1894 — Croatia, Asia, Madagascar

See also
 List of Synaphridae species

References

 

 
Araneomorphae families